Mastiphal may refer to:

 Mastiphal (band), a prominent Polish black metal band
 Mastiphal (Dungeons & Dragons), a demon lord in Dungeons & Dragons

pl:Mastiphal